Kentucky Route 153 (KY 153) is a  state highway in Henry County, Kentucky. It runs from KY 1861 west of Smithfield to U.S. Route 42 (US 42) north of Pendleton.

Major intersections

References

0153
Kentucky Route 153